The fourteenth season of the American television medical drama Grey's Anatomy was ordered on February 10, 2017, by American Broadcasting Company (ABC), and premiered on September 28, 2017 with a special 2-hour premiere. The season consists of 24 episodes, with the season's seventh episode marking the 300th episode for the series overall. The season is produced by ABC Studios, in association with Shondaland Production Company and Entertainment One Television.

Krista Vernoff who helped co-lead the show with Shonda Rhimes in its early years, marked her return as co-showrunner this season with William Harper, having previously left at the end of the seventh season. Rhimes left ABC to produce television for Netflix, and now has a hands-off approach to the show. Despite not being showrunner since its eighth season to run Scandal, Rhimes still signed off each episode's storyline, but this season marked a departure from this. Rhimes explained she only trusted Vernoff to pursue uncharted territory without her. As such, drastic creative changes occurred in the season, with Vernoff retiring Martin Henderson, Jessica Capshaw, and Sarah Drew's characters. Jason George also departs as Ben Warren to appear in the second spin-off, Station 19.

On April 20, 2018, ABC officially renewed Grey's Anatomy for a network primetime drama record-tying fifteenth season.

Episodes

The number in the "No. overall" column refers to the episode's number within the overall series, whereas the number in the "No. in season" column refers to the episode's number within this particular season. "U.S. viewers in millions" refers to the number of Americans in millions who watched the episodes live. Each episode of this season, with the exception of episode nine, is named after a song.

Cast and characters

Main 
 Ellen Pompeo as Dr. Meredith Grey
 Justin Chambers as Dr. Alex Karev
 Chandra Wilson as Dr. Miranda Bailey
 James Pickens Jr. as Dr. Richard Webber
 Kevin McKidd as Dr. Owen Hunt
 Jessica Capshaw as Dr. Arizona Robbins
 Sarah Drew as Dr. April Kepner
 Jesse Williams as Dr. Jackson Avery
 Caterina Scorsone as Dr. Amelia Shepherd
 Camilla Luddington as Dr. Jo Wilson
 Kelly McCreary as Dr. Maggie Pierce
 Jason George as Dr. Ben Warren
 Martin Henderson as Dr. Nathan Riggs
 Giacomo Gianniotti as Dr. Andrew DeLuca

Recurring 
 Kim Raver as Dr. Teddy Altman 
 Greg Germann as Dr. Tom Koracick
 Jake Borelli as Dr. Levi Schmitt 
 Debbie Allen as Dr. Catherine Avery / Catherine Fox
 Abigail Spencer as Dr. Megan Hunt  
 Matthew Morrison as Dr. Paul Stadler
 Stefania Spampinato as Dr. Carina DeLuca 
 Jeanine Mason as Dr. Sam Bello 
 Alex Blue Davis as Dr. Casey Parker 
 Rushi Kota as Dr. Vikram Roy 
 Jaicy Elliot as Dr. Taryn Helm 
 Sophia Ali as Dr. Dahlia Qadri 
 Lesley Boone as Judy Kemp
 Blake Hood as Clive Johnson
 Bethany Joy Lenz as Jenny 
 Justin Bruening as Matthew Taylor
 Nayah Damasen as Kimmie Park
 Peyton Kennedy as Betty Nelson
 Candis Cayne as Dr. Michelle Velez
 Rachel Ticotin as Dr. Marie Cerone

Notable guests 
 Scott Speedman as Dr. Nick Marsh
 Debra Mooney as Evelyn Hunt
 Bill Smitrovich as Dr. Walter Carr
 Chelcie Ross as Dr. Harper Avery
 Kate Burton as Dr. Ellis Grey
 Mark Moses as Dr. Larry Maxwell
 Jaina Lee Ortiz as Andrea 'Andy' Herrera
 Mary Kay Place as Olive Warner
 Josh Plasse as Chris Cleaver
 Frankie Faison as William Bailey
 Bianca Taylor as Elena Bailey
 Nicole Cummins as Paramedic Nicole 
 Julie Gonzalo as Theresa 
 Sarah Utterback as Nurse Olivia Harper 
 Lindsay Wagner as Helen Karev 
 Geena Davis as Dr. Nicole Herman 
 Caleb Pierce as Charlie Peterson 
 Alan Chow as Henry

Production

Development 
Grey's Anatomy was renewed for a 14th season on February 10, 2017. It premiered on September 28, 2017, with a 2-hour premiere. Ellen Pompeo announced that she would be directing several episodes in the 14th season. On April 28, 2017, veteran writer Krista Vernoff announced that she would return to the show as a writer after leaving the show after the seventh season. On January 11, 2018, ABC released a 6-episode web series following the new surgical interns at Grey Sloan Memorial Hospital. The web series was written by Barbara Kaye Friend and directed by series-regular Sarah Drew.

Casting 
Series regular Jerrika Hinton does not appear for the first time since her introduction at the start of the ninth season, after it was announced she landed a starring role in Alan Ball's new HBO drama series Here and Now. Hinton had previously been in talks of leaving the show at the end of the 12th season when she was cast in the Shondaland comedy pilot Toast, but ABC passed on the project. Renewing her contract for another 3 seasons as Dr. Arizona Robbins after the eleventh season, Jessica Capshaw returned for the fourteenth season. On June 20, 2017, it was announced that Kim Raver would reprise her role as Dr. Teddy Altman for a guest-arc. In August 2017, it was announced that Abigail Spencer would replace Bridget Regan as Megan Hunt for a multi-episode arc this season. After recurring in the previous season as the controversial character, Eliza Minnick, it was announced in August 2017 that Marika Dominczyk would not return to the show. On September 13, 2017, another guest-star was announced in Greg Germann (Ally McBeal), and later it was revealed that his character would be Tom Koracick, Amelia's neurosurgery mentor.

On October 9, 2017, the new group of interns to join the cast in the fourth episode "Ain't That A Kick In The Head" was announced to include Jeanine Mason (So You Think You Can Dance) as Sam Bello, Alex Blue Davis as Casey Parker, Rushi Kota as Vik Roy, Jaicy Elliot as Taryn Helm, Sophia Ali as Dahlia Qadri, and Jake Borelli as Levi Schmitt. On October 26, 2017, it was announced that Martin Henderson's appearance in the fifth episode titled "Danger Zone" would be his last.

On January 31, 2018, it was announced that Candis Cayne would be joining the show as Dr. Michelle Velez for a multi-episode arc revolving around a transgender character receiving a ground-breaking surgery. On March 8, 2018, it was announced that both Jessica Capshaw and Sarah Drew would leave the series following the conclusion of the season.

It was released on April 4, 2018 that a familiar character would be returning to the set later on in the season as Sarah Utterback's Nurse Olivia Harper would be revisiting Grey Sloan, not as a nurse but as mom of a patient. Details of her storyline or duration of arc have yet to be released. On April 20, 2018, it was released that Geena Davis would return for the episode "Cold as Ice" as Dr. Herman to present a new opportunity for Arizona.

Ratings

Live + SD ratings

Live + 7 Day (DVR) ratings

Home Media

References

2017 American television seasons
2018 American television seasons
Grey's Anatomy seasons